is a Japanese film directed by Ryoichi Kimizuka, starring Toshiyuki Nishida. It premiered at the Montreal World Film Festival in September 2012, and was released at cinemas in Japan on 23 February 2013.

Outline
The film is based on the non-fiction book  by Kota Ishii. Set in Kamaishi, Iwate, following the 2011 Tōhoku earthquake and tsunami, Aiba (played by Toshiyuki Nishida) is a retired funeral-home employee who volunteers to assist in the task of preparing bodies at a temporary morgue set up in a school gymnasium.

Cast
 Toshiyuki Nishida as Aiba
 Koichi Sato as a doctor
 Toshirō Yanagiba as a dentist
 Ryo Katsuji
 Jun Kunimura	
 Naoto Ogata	
 Wakana Sakai	
 Shiro Sano	
 Ikki Sawamura	
 Mirai Shida
 Michitaka Tsutsui

Music
The ending theme song, "Pray for the World", was sung by Japanese singer Shanti Snyder.

Release

Theatrical run
The film premiered at the Montreal World Film Festival in September 2012, and was released at cinemas in Japan on 23 February 2013.

References

External links
  
 Fuji TV film details 

 Tokyo Time Out review
 Variety review

2012 films
Films set in Iwate Prefecture
Films shot in Japan
Films based on non-fiction books
Japanese drama films
Films about the 2011 Tōhoku earthquake and tsunami
2010s Japanese films